33 Pegasi is the Flamsteed designation for a visual binary star in the northern constellation of Pegasus. It has an apparent visual magnitude of 6.2, placing it near the limit of naked eye visibility. It is drifting further away with a radial velocity of 24 km/s.

The primary component of this system is a main sequence star with a visual magnitude of 6.4 and a stellar classification of F7 V. It is nearly as old as the Sun with an estimated age of 4.1 billion years, but has a lower abundance of elements other than hydrogen and helium. The star has 1.3 times the mass and radius of the Sun. The stellar atmosphere has an effective temperature of 6,169 K, giving it the yellow-white glow of an F-type star.

A faint, magnitude 9.3 companion star is located at an angular separation of 0.420 arc seconds along a position angle of 0.0°.

References

F-type main-sequence stars
Binary stars

Pegasus (constellation)
8532
Durchmusterung objects
Pegasi, 33
212395
110548